Heide railway station may refer to 
Heide (Germany) station
Heide railway station, Belgium